Jacky Harris (17 November 1900 – 25 November 1943) was an Australian rules footballer who played with South Melbourne in the Victorian Football League (VFL).

Notes

External links 

1900 births
1943 deaths
Australian rules footballers from Victoria (Australia)
Australian Rules footballers: place kick exponents
Sydney Swans players